The Ibn Marwan Mosque (transl: Jami' Ibn Marwan) is a Mamluk-era mosque in Gaza in the midst of a cemetery in the Tuffah neighborhood, relatively isolated from the rest of the city. Inside is the tomb of a holy man named Sheikh Ali ibn Marwan who belonged to the Hasani family. The Hasani family came from Morocco and settled in Gaza where Ibn Marwan died in 1314 CE. The cemetery is also named after Ibn Marwan. The mosque itself was built in 1324. The Ibn Marwan Mosque contains an oratory and the stones of the tombs in the adjacent cemetery are believed to contain historical inscriptions.

References

Further reading

External links
Photos of the mosque interior  Discover Islam.

Religious buildings and structures completed in 1324
14th-century mosques
Mamluk architecture in the State of Palestine
Mosques in Gaza City